Norchard is a railway station on the Dean Forest Railway, near Lydney in the Forest of Dean, Gloucestershire.

Norchard is the main station of the Dean Forest Railway. Complete with sidings and a shed, it is the engineering base of the railway. Also to be found at this station are the museum, gift shop, cafe, toilets, main ticket office, and a large free car park. Around Norchard there are many footpaths providing access to the forest, many with views of the trains.

Access between the ticket office and the platforms is via a level crossing. The station has three platforms, two at the Low Level station, plus one at the high level. Platform 2 has the purpose-built cafe and the 9681 shop which is in a coach. Norchard High Level has just one platform (Platform 3), but it serves trains from both Lydney Junction and Parkend, making it the main platform.

Services

See also 

 Dean Forest Railway

References

Heritage railway stations in Gloucestershire
Railway stations built for UK heritage railways
Railway stations in Great Britain opened in 1991
Lydney
1991 establishments in England